Dragomir Bukvić (born April 29, 1954) is a Serbian professional basketball coach and former player.

Playing career 
Bukvić started to play basketball for youth teams of Sloboda Tuzla and Radnički Belgrade. He had his first senior basketball experience with Radnički Belgrade of the Yugoslav First League in the 1975–76 season. He served the army in 1976. Later he played for the Dinamo Pančevo and the Mladost Zemun. In 1984 he retired.

Coaching career

Men's basketball 
On the beginning of his coaching career he was head coach for the Mladost Zemun.

Women's club basketball 
Bukvić coached teams in Serbia, Slovenia and Italy. He coached Partizan, Kovin, Vojvodina and Crvena zvezda of the First League of FY Yugoslavia/Serbia and Montenegro. Also, he spent the 2007–08 season with Crvena zvezda competing at the First League of Serbia. Bukvić coached the Lek Ježica, the Merkur Celje and the Grosbasket of the Slovenian League. He won three Slovenian championships and four cup tournaments. In Italy, he coached the Pool Comense and the Virtus Sogeit La Spezia of the Serie A1.

Women national teams

SFR Yugoslavia  
Bukvić won silver medal at the 1991 European Championship for Cadettes with SFR Yugoslavia U14 national team. Also, he led women's university team at the 1995 Summer Universiade in Fukuoka.

FR Yugoslavia/Serbia and Montenegro  
Bukvić was a head coach for the FR Yugoslavia women's national team at the EuroBasket Women 1995. Also, he led women's university team at the 1995 Summer Universiade in Fukuoka, Japan and at the 2005 Summer Universiade in İzmir, Turkey where he won a silver medal. He won silver medal at the 1999 European Championship for Cadettes with FR Yugoslavia U16 national team.

Serbia  
Bukvić won silver medal at the 2006 FIBA Europe Under-20 Championship for Women - Division B with the Serbia women's national under-20 team. He also coached U20 at the 2010 Championship.

Slovenia  
Bukvić was a head coach for the Slovenia women's national team from 2001 to 2003. He led women's university team at the 2003 Summer Universiade in Daegu, South Korea.

Career achievements and awards
 Slovenian Women's Basketball League champion: 3 (with Lek Ježica: 2000–01, 2001–02 and with Merkur Celje: 2002–03)
 Yugoslav Women's Basketball Cup winner: 1 (with Crvena zvezda: 1994–95)
 Slovenian Women's Basketball Cup winner: 4 (with Lek Ježica: 2000–01, 2001–02 and with Merkur Celje: 2002–03, 2006–07)

Individual
 Slovenian Coach of the Year (women's basketball): 2001, 2002

References

External links 
 Coach Profile at eurobasket.com

1954 births
Living people
KK Dinamo Pančevo players
KK Mladost Zemun players
KK Mladost Zemun coaches
BKK Radnički players
Serbia and Montenegro national basketball team coaches
Serbian men's basketball coaches
Serbian expatriate basketball people in Italy
Serbian expatriate basketball people in Slovenia
Serbian men's basketball players
Slovenian basketball coaches
Slovenian people of Serbian descent
ŽKK Partizan coaches
ŽKK Crvena zvezda coaches
Yugoslav basketball coaches
Yugoslav men's basketball players